Piermaria Bagnadore (c. 1550–1627), also called Pietro Maria Bagnatori, was an Italian painter, sculptor, and architect of the late-Renaissance period.

Biography
Born in Orzinuovi, he trained with il Moretto da Brescia, and painted mainly in Brescia from the late 16th century until the 1610s.

He was active mainly in Brescia. He helped direct the sculptural decoration of the Duomo Nuovo between 1604 and 1611. He designed and sculpted the Mannerist style fountain at the base of the Torre della Palata, with collaborations from Antonio Carra and Valentino Bonesini. Among his other works is the design of the Church of the Madonna del Lino during 1604–1609. He also participated in the reconstruction of the church of San Domenico (1611) and the church of Sant'Angela Merici.

He helped design the bell-tower of the church of San Giuseppe, the monumental portico in via Dieci Giornate and of corso Zanardelli at Piazza dell Loggia. He helped plan the enlargement of the church of Santissimo Corpo di Cristo (1620).

Among his paintings were a Birth of Jesus for the church of San Carlo, and Adoration of Shepherds over the lateral portal of the church of Santa Maria delle Grazie, along with a St Anne and young John the Baptist and an altarpiece depicting the Immaculate Conception; and a Dead Christ for the nave of Sant'Angela Merici.

His work was noted by the biographer Luigi Lanzi.  His extensive print collection passed into the hands of Count Camillo Gonzaga of Novellara

References

1550s births
1627 deaths
16th-century Italian painters
Italian male painters
17th-century Italian painters
Italian Baroque painters
Painters from Brescia
16th-century Italian architects
17th-century Italian architects
Italian Renaissance architects
Architects from Brescia